Afrizal Azwan Shuhaimi is a Malaysian international lawn bowler.

Bowls career
Shuhaimi won the bronze medal in the triples with Mohd Amir Mohd Yusof and Azim Azami Ariffin at the 2008 World Outdoor Bowls Championship in Christchurch.

He has won four medals at the Asia Pacific Bowls Championships, which includes a gold medal in the fours with (Fairul Izwan Abd Muin, Mohd Amir Mohd Yusof and Azim Azami Ariffin), at the 2009 Championships held in his own country. In 2007, he also won the gold medal in the triples event at the 2007 Southeast Asian Games in Nakhon Ratchasima.

References

1986 births
Malaysian male bowls players
Living people
Southeast Asian Games medalists in lawn bowls
Southeast Asian Games gold medalists for Malaysia
Southeast Asian Games silver medalists for Malaysia
Competitors at the 2005 Southeast Asian Games
Competitors at the 2007 Southeast Asian Games